Two ships of the Royal Navy have borne the name HMS Goelan, the Anglicization of Goéland, the Breton word for seagull:

Goelan was broken up in 1810.

Citations and references
Citations

References
 

Royal Navy ship names